Dorstenia hildegardis is a plant species in the family Moraceae which is native to eastern Brazil.

References

hildegardis
Plants described in 1978
Flora of Brazil